"Another Time, Another Place" is a popular song published in 1958.  The music was written by Jay Livingston, the lyrics by Ray Evans.

Background and chart performance
It was featured in the movie of the same name. It was popularized by Patti Page in 1958. The Page recording was released by Mercury Records as catalog number 71294. It first reached the Billboard magazine charts on May 5, 1958. On the Disk Jockey chart, it peaked at number 20, on the composite chart of the top 100 songs, it reached number 81.

References

1958 songs
Patti Page songs
Songs with lyrics by Ray Evans
Songs with music by Jay Livingston